Nusantara most commonly refers to:
Nusantara (archipelago), an Old Javanese term which initially referred to the conquered territories of the Majapahit empire, corresponding to present-day Indonesia
Nusantara (planned city), the future capital city of Indonesia

Nusantara may also refer to:

Organisation and building
Bina Nusantara University (abbreviated as BINUS University), a private university in Jakarta, Indonesia
Merpati Nusantara Airlines, an Indonesian airline based in Central Jakarta
Multimedia Nusantara University, a private university in Tangerang, Banten, Indonesia
Nusantara Air Charter, an Indonesian airline which operates charter flights
Nusantara Society, a Russian non-profit society for intellectuals
Nusantara TV, an Indonesian private digital TV network
PT Pasifik Satelit Nusantara, an Indonesian satellite communication company formed in 1991
PT Perkebunan Nusantara IX, a state-owned Indonesian agricultural company
Taruna Nusantara, a boarding senior high school in Magelang, Central Java, Indonesia
Wisma Nusantara, an office building located in Jakarta, Indonesia

Other uses
Islam Nusantara, a distinctive branch of Islam developed in the Indonesian archipelago
Katibah Nusantara, a Southeast Asian military unit within the Islamic State of Iraq and the Levant
Nusantara Satu, an Indonesian satellite
Wawasan Nusantara, the national vision of Indonesia towards their people, nation, and territory